A diabetic bulla  is a cutaneous condition characterized by a noninflammatory, spontaneous, painless blister, often in acral locations (peripheral body parts, such as feet, toes, hands, fingers, ears or nose), seen in diabetic patients.

See also 
 Diabetic dermadromes
 Skin lesion
 List of cutaneous conditions

References

External links 

Skin conditions resulting from errors in metabolism